Pink House may refer to:

Buildings
 Casa Rosada or Casa de Gobierno (Government House), the official seat of the executive branch of government for Argentina
 Pink House (Melbourne Beach, Florida)
 Pink House (Newbury, Massachusetts)
 Pink House (Kansas City, Missouri)
 Pink House (Charleston, South Carolina)
 The Pink House, a building on the campus of Princeton University, part of Forbes College
 Louis Heaton Pink Houses, a Brooklyn, New York public housing project

Other
 The Pink House (film), 2017 Peruvian thriller drama film directed by Palito Ortega Matute
 "Pink Houses", a song by John Cougar Mellencamp